List of the National Register of Historic Places listings in Rockland County, New York

This is intended to be a complete list of properties and districts listed on the National Register of Historic Places in Rockland County, New York.  The locations of National Register properties and districts (at least for all showing latitude and longitude coordinates below) may be seen in a map by clicking on "Map of all coordinates".  There are three properties and districts that are further designated U.S. National Historic Landmarks.



Listings county-wide

 

|}

Former listing

|}

See also

National Register of Historic Places listings in New York

References

Rockland County